Events from the year 1779 in Spain.

Incumbents
Monarch: Charles III

Events
April 12 - Treaty of Aranjuez (1779)

Births
October 25 - Pedro Velarde y Santillán (d. 1808)

Deaths

 
1770s in Spain
Years of the 18th century in Spain